Legislative elections were held in France in August and September 1792 to elect members of the National Convention. It established the nation's first government without a monarch.

The elections were held in August and September and lasted three weeks; royalist and Girondin candidates were boycotted. To be an elector a citizen had to be over 21, resident one year in his department and not a domestic servant. An elector could stand as a candidate in any constituency. To be a delegate or a deputy an elector had to be over 25. If at the first ballot no candidate received an absolute majority of votes cast, there was to be a second ballot at which only the top two candidates of the first could compete.

According to Malcolm Crook "Evidence of orchestrated attempts to intimidate rivals is not hard to find.

An absolute majority of the male deputies elected belonged to the Marais party, a political faction of vague but largely moderate policies. The Montagnards or Jacobins received 200 seats and the republican, though more moderate Girondin faction 160 seats, although according to Ian Davidson these are not hard numerical facts. The election preceded the fall of the Girondins as a political faction, mainly because of the political and social unrest following the war started by the Girondin-dominated government in the spring of 1792.

References

Elections in France
National
18th-century elections in Europe
1792 events of the French Revolution
French National Convention